St Andrew's Church, Cubley is a  Grade I listed parish church in the Church of England in Cubley, Derbyshire.

History

The church dates from the mid-11th century, with additions in the 12th, and 13th centuries. The west tower was built in the 15th century in a late Perpendicular Gothic style. It has pinnacles and an embattled parapet and is ornamented with thirteen shields of the Montgomery family and its alliances and other sculptured devices.

It comprises a western tower, nave with south aisle, chancel, and south porch. It was restored between 1872 and 1874 by the architect James Piers St Aubyn.

Parish status
The church is in a joint parish with:

St John's Church, Alkmonton
St Cuthbert's Church, Doveridge
St Giles’ Church, Marston Montgomery
St Paul's Church, Scropton
St Peter's Church, Somersal Herbert
All Saints’ Church, Sudbury

Memorials
Sir Nicholas Montgomery (d. 1494) MP for Derbyshire (UK Parliament constituency) in 1388, 1390 and 1411

Organ

The pipe organ was built by  Peter Conacher and dates from 1896. A specification of the organ can be found on the National Pipe Organ Register.

See also
Grade I listed churches in Derbyshire
Grade I listed buildings in Derbyshire
Listed buildings in Cubley, Derbyshire

References

Church of England church buildings in Derbyshire
Grade I listed churches in Derbyshire